Cristina González may refer to:
Cristina González Cruz (born 1973), Mexican politician and lawyer
Cristina González Ramos (born 1983), Spanish handballer

See also
Cristina Gonzales (born 1976), Filipino former actress turned politician